Pakalihawa  is a village development committee in Rupandehi District in Lumbini Province of southern Nepal. At the time of the 2011 Nepal census it had a population of 63483 people living in 1153 individual households.

References

Populated places in Rupandehi District